Charles Macauley may refer to:

Charles Macaulay (1927-1999), American actor and director
Charles R. Macauley (1871–1934), American cartoonist
C. Cameron Macauley (1923–2007), American photographer and filmmaker
Ed Macauley (Charles Edward Macauley, 1928–2011), basketball player

See also
Charles McAuley (1910–1999), Irish painter